James McClellan Robinson (May 31, 1861 – January 16, 1942) was an American lawyer and politician who served four terms as a U.S. Representative from Indiana from 1897 to 1905.

Biography 
Born on a farm near Fort Wayne, Indiana, Robinson attended the public schools.
He studied law.
He was admitted to the bar in 1882 and commenced practice in Fort Wayne, Indiana.

He served as prosecuting attorney for the thirty-eighth judicial circuit of Indiana 1886–1890.
He resumed the practice of law.

Congress 
Robinson was elected as a Democrat to the Fifty-fifth and to the three succeeding Congresses (March 4, 1897 – March 3, 1905).
He was an unsuccessful candidate for reelection in 1904 to the Fifty-ninth Congress.

Later career and death 
He continued the practice of law in Fort Wayne, Indiana, until 1908.
He moved to Los Angeles, California, in 1911.

He died in Los Angeles, January 16, 1942.
He was interred in Lindenwood Cemetery, Fort Wayne, Indiana.

References

1861 births
1942 deaths
Politicians from Fort Wayne, Indiana
Democratic Party members of the United States House of Representatives from Indiana